Marion Kracht (born 5 December 1962 in Munich, Germany) is a German actress. Currently she resides in Berlin.

Selected filmography
Who Laughs Last, Laughs Best (1971)
Passion Flower Hotel (1978), as Jane
 (1981), as Gerti
Ein Heim für Tiere (1985–1989, TV series), as Lisa Bayer
Diese Drombuschs (1985–1994, TV series), as Tina Reibold
Der Havelkaiser (1994–2000, TV series), as Jette Kaiser
Hallo Robbie! (2001–2006, TV series), as Frauke Marten
 (2002), as Christa
Familie Sonnenfeld (2005–2009, TV series), as Tina Sonnenfeld
Liebe, Babys und ein großes Herz (2006–2012, TV series), as Antonia Maibach
My Führer – The Really Truest Truth about Adolf Hitler (2007), as Make-Up Artist Rosemarie Riefenstahl
Babylon Berlin (2017, TV series), as Mother Jänicke

External links 
Marion Kracht official Website

Max Management Potsdam 

German television actresses
Actresses from Munich
1962 births
Living people
20th-century German actresses
21st-century German actresses